Carl Christoph Wilhelm Theodor Albert Sprengel (30 September 1832, Wollershausen – 4 July 1900, Reval) was a Baltic-German painter, writer and professor, associated with the Düsseldorfer Malerschule. Although most of his works are portraits, he is also known for landscapes and historical scenes.

Life and work 
He was born to the pastor, Georg Wilhelm Theodor Sprengel, and his second wife, Charlotte née Gnüge. From 1844 to 1848, he attended the gymnasium in Heiligenstadt. After graduating, he attended the Dresden Academy of Fine Arts then, in 1852, transferred to the Kunstakademie Düsseldorf. There, he studied with Christian Köhler and the history painter, Theodor Hildebrandt. He completed his studies in 1854.

From 1856 to 1866, he worked as a drawing teacher at the Behmsche Lehranstalt, a German-language school in Vyborg. During this time he was awarded the title of "Free Artist" by the Imperial Academy of Fine Arts in St. Petersburg. After 1866, he was a writing and drawing teacher at the Gustav Adolf Grammar School in Reval (Tallinn). Later, he also taught at a secondary school for girls and a technical school. His teaching method emphasized each individual's special talents. His best known students include Gregor von Bochmann,  and Ants Laikmaa.

Throughout the 1860s and 1870s, he gave public lectures on German art. He also wrote reviews of the exhibitions at the local museums; which were some of the first to discuss Scandinavian and Finnish art. As a writer, in addition to works on art, he produced children's books, novellas, poetry and travelogues.

While in Vyborg, in 1862, he married Caroline Friedrike Wilhelmine von Frisch (1842–1915), the daughter of Dr. Robert Wilhelm von Frisch (1808–1855), from Weißenstein. They had one child, Charlotte Friederike Luise (1867–1954), who married the chemist Michael Wittlich.

References

Further reading 
 "Theodor Albert Sprengel". In: Gotthard von Hansen: Geschichtsblätter des revalschen Gouvernements-Gymnasiums zu dessen 250jährigem Jubiläum am 6. Juni 1881. Reval 1881, pg.241
 "Sprengel, Theodor Albert". In: Wilhelm Neumann: Lexikon Baltischer Künstler. Verlag von Jonck & Poliewsky, Riga 1908, pg.153.
 "Sprengel, Theodor Albert". In: Hans Paffrath (Ed.): Lexikon der Düsseldorfer Malerschule 1819–1918. Vol.3: Nabert–Zwecker., Bruckmann, 1998, pp. 310 f. 
 Carola L. Gottzmann, Petra Hörner: Lexikon der deutschsprachigen Literatur des Baltikums und St. Petersburgs. De Gruyter, Berlin 2007, pp. 1219-1220

External links 

 "Theodor Albert Sprengel" @ the Baltisches Biografisches Lexikon Digital

1832 births
1900 deaths
Baltic-German people
19th-century German painters
19th-century German male artists
Estonian painters
Kunstakademie Düsseldorf alumni
People from Göttingen (district)